Cromers is an unincorporated community in Seneca County, in the U.S. state of Ohio.

History
A post office was established at Cromers in 1875, and remained in operation until 1952. Besides the post office, Cromers had a railroad depot.

References

Unincorporated communities in Seneca County, Ohio
Unincorporated communities in Ohio